Brunei Museum Journal is an academic journal, published annually by the Brunei Museum.  Its first volume was produced in 1969.

The journal is dedicated to the advancement of knowledge of Brunei Darussalam, Borneo, and Southeast Asia.  A large variety of topics are covered, including both the sciences and humanities subjects such as Archaeology, Ethnography and History.

Contributors include both Museum staff and individuals not affiliated with the Brunei Museum.

Between 1970 and 1986, the Brunei Museum Journal produced six monographs on a variety of subjects.  In addition, from 1991 the Brunei Museum has published a number of 'Special Publications'.

Monographs of the Brunei Museum Journal
 1970 D. E. Brown Brunei: The Structure and History of Bornean Malay Sultanate 
 1974 Tom Harrisson  Prehistoric Wood from Brunei
 1979  Shaer Yang Di-Pertuan Sultan Muhammad Jamalul Alam Pehin Siraja Khatib Abdul Razak bin Hassanudin  Transliterated from Jawi script
 1980 H. G. Keith The United States Consul and The Yankee Raja
 1982 R.W. Beales, D.J.Currie and R.H. Lindley Investigations into Fisheries Resources in Brunei
 1986 Lim Jock Seng The Inter-relationship of Technology, Economy and Social Organization in a Fishing Village in Brunei

External links
 Government of Brunei Darussalam official webpage about the journal

Asian history journals
Communications in Brunei
Publications established in 1969
Academic journals published by museums